"Labios Compartidos" (English: "Shared Lips") is the first single released from Maná's seventh studio album, Amar es Combatir (2006). It became one of the band's most recognized songs, topping the Billboard Hot Latin Tracks chart for eight consecutive weeks.

Song information
The song deals with the theme of falling in love with someone else's lover; that's where the title of the song comes from (literally "Shared Lips"). The music video for the song also has this concept.

Chart success
"Labios Compartidos" became a major hit in dozens of countries, topping the  Spanish charts for three weeks.

The song has also enjoyed some moderate success in the United States. It debuted at number one on the Billboard Hot Latin Tracks chart and on the Latin Pop Tracks chart.

"Labios Compartidos" stayed on the top of the Hot Latin Tracks chart for nine weeks, becoming the band's first number one on that chart since "Mariposa Traicionera" (2003). The song was also able to perform a minor crossover into mainstream radio stations and peaked at number 82 on the US Billboard Hot 100, becoming the band's biggest hit on the United States to this date. It also charted on the Hot Ringtones chart, peaking at number 12.

Music video
The music video for the song, which was directed by Pablo Croce, depicts a woman taking advantage of a man, and making him suffer through the knowledge that she betrays him. This fits in with the idea that he's sharing her with another but is unable to leave her because he always falls for her when she returns. When the song entered on the US Billboard Hot 100, MTV Hits started to air the music video.

Awards
On October 19, 2006, the song and video were nominated for both Video of the Year and Song of the Year on Los Premios MTV Latinoamérica, only to win Video of the Year. On August 29, 2007, Fher Olvera received a Latin Grammy Award nomination for this song in Song of the Year category. Also, the video was nominated for Best Music Video, winning none.

Charts

Weekly charts

Year-end charts

Certifications

See also
List of number-one Billboard Hot Latin Songs of 2006

References

2006 singles
Maná songs
Spanish-language songs
Rock ballads
Songs written by Fher Olvera
Record Report Top Latino number-one singles
Warner Music Latina singles